LukArco B.V. is a subsidiary of the Russian oil company Lukoil. It was formed in February 1997 as a joint venture between Lukoil and the former American oil company ARCO. 
In 2000, Arco merged with the UK oil company BP, and since BP became a shareholder of LukArco with 46% shares. In December 2009, BP sold its stake to Lukoil and thereafter Lukoil became a sole shareholder of LukArco.

LukArco is a partner in the Caspian Pipeline Consortium with a shareholding of 12.5%, and is a partner in the consortium Tengizchevroil (TCO).

References

Oil companies of the Netherlands
Oil and gas companies of Kazakhstan
ARCO
Lukoil